Paul Rees (born 20 April 1986) is a British racing driver. Rees is currently competing in the 2016 Porsche Mobil 1 Supercup. He has previously competed in the FIA Formula Two Championship. His father is the former Formula 1 driver Alan Rees.

Racing record

Career summary

† As Rees was a guest driver, he was ineligible to score points.

Complete FIA Formula Two Championship results
(key) (Races in bold indicate pole position) (Races in italics indicate fastest lap)

Complete Porsche Supercup results
(key) (Races in bold indicate pole position) (Races in italics indicate fastest lap)

‡ Rees was a guest driver, therefore he was ineligible for points.
† Driver did not finish the race, but was classified as he completed over 75% of the race distance.

References

External links
 
 

1986 births
Living people
British racing drivers
Formula BMW USA drivers
Formula BMW UK drivers
French Formula Renault 2.0 drivers
British Formula Renault 2.0 drivers
Formula Palmer Audi drivers
FIA Formula Two Championship drivers
International GT Open drivers
Porsche Supercup drivers
Porsche Carrera Cup GB drivers
Mark Burdett Motorsport drivers
Fortec Motorsport drivers
Walker Racing drivers
GT4 European Series drivers